For the First Time may refer to:

Films
 For the First Time (1959 film), a musical starring Mario Lanza
 For the First Time (1967 film), a Cuban short film
 For the First Time (2008 film), a Filipino romantic film

Albums
 For the First Time (Count Basie album), 1974
 For the First Time (Black Country, New Road album), 2021
 For the First Time (Stephanie Mills album), 1975
 For the First Time (Kim Weston album), 1967

Songs
 "For the First Time" (Kenny Loggins song), 1996
 "For the First Time" (Darius Rucker song), 2017
 "For the First Time" (The Script song), 2010
 "For the First Time", a song by the Afters from the 2010 album Light Up the Sky

See also
 "Come prima", a 1950s Italian popular song, recorded in English versions as "For the First Time"
 First Time (disambiguation)